Elachista impiger is a moth of the family Elachistidae. It is found in Australia.

The wingspan is 6-6.2 mm. The ground colour of the forewings is bluish grey, with dark grey-tipped scales. The hindwings are grey.

References

Moths described in 2011
impiger
Moths of Australia